Thai Airways International Flight 601 was a Sud Aviation Caravelle that crashed into the sea on landing at the former Kai Tak Airport, Hong Kong, in a typhoon on Friday, 30 June 1967.

Accident 
Thai Airways International Flight 601 took off from Taipei Songshan Airport (TSA/RCSS) on an hour-long flight to Kai Tak Airport. The Sud Aviation Caravelle (Registration: HS-TGI), which had made its first flight in 1960, had 80 souls aboard: 73 passengers and 7 crew. The aircraft undershot runway 31 and crashed into the sea, killing 24 passengers.

Probable cause 
The probable cause of the accident was pilot error, specifically not noticing that the aircraft had descended below the glide slope. The presence of strong wind shear and downdrafts as a result of then-present Typhoon Anita was a probable contributing factor. However, at the time of the accident there were no means of detecting such weather phenomena. Further factors included:

 The pilots did not adhere to Thai Airways procedure for a captain-monitored Instrument approach in bad visibility.
 The captain did not monitor the approach adequately.
 The abrupt heading change after the aircraft descended below minimum altitude may have exacerbated the high rate of descent.
 Downdrafts and wind shear may have contributed to the height loss which resulted from this mishandling.

References 
 
  

Aviation accidents and incidents in 1967
Aviation accidents and incidents in Hong Kong
Accidents and incidents involving the Sud Aviation Caravelle
601
Airliner accidents and incidents involving controlled flight into terrain
Airliner accidents and incidents caused by weather
Airliner accidents and incidents caused by pilot error
1967 in Hong Kong
1967 meteorology
June 1967 events in Asia